DN2 is a national road in Romania which links Bucharest with the historical regions of Moldavia and Bukovina in north-east Romania. Recently upgraded, it is today one of the best-maintained roads in the country. The main cities linked by the DN2 are: Bucharest, Buzău, Focșani, Bacău, Roman, and Suceava.

Along the first  from Bucharest to Săbăoani, near Roman the road has two lanes with one narrow emergency lane and reconstructed bridges. The road continues to Siret, at the Ukrainian border as a simple two-lanes road. Together with the adjacent section of DN28, Săbăoani – Iași, part of E583, the DN2 is currently Moldavia's backbone.

The DN2 is also considered Romania's most dangerous trunk road. The road has high accident rates, and the Bucharest–Săbăoani section is the most affected, due to drivers improperly using the emergency lanes. This has prompted the CNAIR (formerly CNADNR, the Romanian National Road Company) to upgrade a segment to a 2+1 road near the Sinești forest, the first 2+1 road in Romania. This upgrade was made in 2019, and due to the resulting low accident rates, it has been demanded that the rest of DN2 between Bucharest and Săbăoani, as well as DN28 to Iași be converted to a 2+1 road also.

The A7 motorway, together with the Bucharest – Ploiești section of the A3 motorway, will serve as a safer and high-speed alternative to the DN2 and will take part of traffic using the road when completed.

See also
Roads in Romania
Transport in Romania

References

Gallery

External links

Roads in Romania
European route E85